Milan Davidov (Serbian Cyrillic: Милан Давидов; born 1 June 1979) is a Serbian former professional footballer.

He also graduated on the University of Novi Sad Faculty of Law in 2011.

Career statistics

References

External links
 HLSZ profile
 

1979 births
Living people
People from Odžaci
Serbian footballers
Association football midfielders
FK Mladost Apatin players
FK Hajduk Kula players
FK Borac Čačak players
FK Vojvodina players
FK Cement Beočin players
Zalaegerszegi TE players
Nyíregyháza Spartacus FC players
FK Inđija players
Serbian SuperLiga players
Nemzeti Bajnokság I players
Serbian expatriate footballers
Expatriate footballers in Hungary
Serbian expatriate sportspeople in Hungary